Tephritis variata is a species of tephritid or fruit flies in the genus Tephritis of the family Tephritidae.

Distribution
Mongolia, China.

References

Tephritinae
Insects described in 1908
Taxa named by Theodor Becker
Diptera of Asia